Schismatorhynchos holorhynchos is a cyprinid fish of the genus Schismatorhynchos. The species was first described by Siebert and Tjakrawidjaja in 1998.

References

Cyprinid fish of Asia
Fish of Malaysia